Rick Comegy (born September 24, 1953) is an American football coach and former player. On January 21, 2014, Comegy was introduced as the head coach at Mississippi Valley State. He previously served as the head football coach at Jackson State University in Jackson, Mississippi from 2006 to 2013. He was named JSU head coach on December 9, 2005 after ten years as head coach of Tuskegee University, where he compiled a 90–26 record. He has also served as head coach of Cheyney University and Central State University, where he won the NAIA national football championship in 1995. He served as an assistant coach at Central State University under former Cheyney/Central State/Florida A&M coach Billy Joe in the  80s and 90s.

Comegy was the 15th head coach at  Tuskegee University in Tuskegee, Alabama and he held that position for ten seasons, from 1996 until 2005.  His coaching record at Tuskegee was 90–26.

Comegy is a 1976 graduate of Millersville University and has held coaching positions at Millersville and Colgate University, where he also coached track and baseball.

Head coaching record

References

External links
 Mississippi Valley State profile

1953 births
Living people
American football defensive backs
Colgate Raiders baseball coaches
Colgate Raiders football coaches
Central State Marauders football coaches
Cheyney Wolves football coaches
Jackson State Tigers football coaches
Millersville Marauders football coaches
Millersville Marauders football players
Mississippi Valley State Delta Devils football coaches
Tuskegee Golden Tigers football coaches
Colgate Raiders track and field coaches
Sportspeople from Chester, Pennsylvania
Coaches of American football from Pennsylvania
Players of American football from Pennsylvania
African-American coaches of American football
African-American players of American football
20th-century African-American sportspeople
21st-century African-American sportspeople